Alberto Suárez Inda (born 30 January 1939) is a Mexican prelate of the Roman Catholic Church. He served as Archbishop of Morelia from 1995 to 2016.

Biography
Alberto Suárez Inda was born in Celaya in Mexico on 30 January 1939.

He studied humanities in Morelia and then attended the Pontifical Latin American College in Rome from 1958 until 1965. He was ordained to the priesthood on 8 August 1964 and began serving as a vicar in Morelia and in Pátzcuaro. He also taught before becoming a parish priest for a newly-established parish in his hometown. He later served as the rector for the minor seminary in Celaya from 1974 until his appointment to the episcopate in 1985 when Pope John Paul II named him as the Bishop of Tacámbaro. He received his episcopal consecration on the following 20 December. He became the Archbishop of Morela in 1995 and oversaw the institution of 40 new parish churches.

On 4 January 2015, following his weekly Angelus address, Pope Francis announced that he would make him a cardinal during a consistory to be held on 14 February. At that ceremony, he was assigned the titular church of San Policarpo. In April 2015 he was appointed a member of the Congregation for the Clergy and the Pontifical Council for Justice and Peace (the latter which was dissolved in 2016). He holds his membership in the former body until he turned 80 on 30 January 2019 at which point he also became ineligible to vote as an elector in a future papal conclave.

Pope Francis accepted his retirement from his archdiocese on 5 November 2016.

References

External links

 

1939 births
Living people
Mexican cardinals
Cardinals created by Pope Francis
21st-century Roman Catholic archbishops in Mexico
People from Celaya
Members of the Congregation for the Clergy
Pontifical Gregorian University alumni
Roman Catholic archbishops of Morelia
20th-century Roman Catholic archbishops in Mexico